The Globe-Miami Browns were a Minor League Baseball team that represented Globe, Arizona and Miami, Arizona in the Arizona–Texas League from 1947 to 1950 and the Arizona–Mexico League in 1955.

An earlier team, the Globe Bears, represented Globe in the Arizona State League from 1929 to 1931.

External links
 Images of Vintage Commemoration Logo
 Baseball Reference

Baseball teams established in 1929
Baseball teams disestablished in 1955
Professional baseball teams in Arizona
Defunct Arizona-Texas League teams
Defunct Arizona State League teams
Defunct Arizona-Mexico League teams
St. Louis Browns minor league affiliates
1929 establishments in Arizona
1955 disestablishments in Arizona
Globe, Arizona
Defunct baseball teams in Arizona